Jill Hennessy (born 17 March 1972) is a former Australian politician. She has been a Labor Party member of the Victorian Legislative Assembly between February 2010 and November 2022, representing the seat of Altona. She was Minister for Health in the Andrews Ministry from December 2014 to November 2018, and was Attorney-General from November 2018 to December 2020, the second female Attorney-General in Victoria's history.

Early life
Hennessy was educated at Avila College, Mount Waverley, and then Monash University where she graduated with a Bachelor of Arts and Bachelor of Laws. She also holds a Master of Laws degree from the University of Melbourne. Prior to entering the Legislative Assembly of Victoria, Hennessy practised as a solicitor specialising in personal injury and employment law, and was a senior advisor to former Victorian premier Steve Bracks.

In 2016, she was awarded the Thornett Award for Promotion of Reason by the Australian Skeptics for "courageously facing down those who misrepresent and mislead the public in their promotion of dodgy medical claims and practices".

Hennessy is a member of Labor's left faction.

Political career
A former candidate for preselection for the federal seats of Holt and Isaacs, Hennessy is a former State President of the Victorian Labor Party. When state minister and Altona MLA Lynne Kosky resigned early in 2010, Hennessy won endorsement for Labor preselection. She was elected to the seat in the by-election, but Labor suffered a large swing to the Liberal Party.

During her tenure as Attorney-General, Hennessy worked on reforms relating to voluntary assisted dying, safe access for women's health services, childhood vaccination, medicinal cannabis and wage theft, as well as reforms to decriminalise public drunkenness, a spent convictions scheme and legislation banning gay conversion being introduced to parliament. 

Hennessy was also Attorney-General during the Royal Commission into the Management of Police Informants and, before the report of the Royal Commission was released, Hennessy referred the case of Faruk Orman to the Court of Appeal citing "credible evidence that there may have been a miscarriage of justice in Mr Orman's case arising from Nicola Gobbo's conduct and use as a human source by Victoria Police." After the release of the report she said "What we've seen and learnt throughout this royal commission over the past two years is truly appalling" and promised to implement all of the recommendations.

On 16 December 2020, she announced she would step down from the role of Victorian Attorney-General effective immediately to spend more time with her family, but intended to stay in Parliament and recontest her seat at the 2022 election before announcing on 24 November 2021, that she would not be recontesting her seat in 2022.

References

External links
 Parliamentary voting record of Jill Hennessy on Victorian Parliament Tracker

1972 births
Living people
Members of the Victorian Legislative Assembly
Australian Labor Party members of the Parliament of Victoria
Australian solicitors
Monash University alumni
Australian people of Irish descent
University of Melbourne alumni
21st-century Australian politicians
21st-century Australian women politicians
Women members of the Victorian Legislative Assembly